Bengbu Medical College (Chinese: 蚌埠医学院) is national medical college in Bengbu, Anhui Province, of the People's Republic of China, directly supervised under the jurisdiction of Education Bureau of Anhui Province.

History
The college was founded in July 1958 with support from the Shanghai Second Medical College and Anhui Medical College. In August 1968, the Anhui Revolutionary Commission renamed it "Bengbu Anti-Revisionism Medical College".

In November 1970, the Revolutionary Commission merged four medical colleges in Anhui into one Anhui Medical College and became Anhui Medical College, Bengbu Campus. In June 1974 the State Council approved the college resuming the name Bengbu Medical College.

Location
The college is in [Bengbu], Anhui Province. The address is 2600 Donghai Ave, Longzihu, Bengbu, Anhui, China. Their phone number is +86 552 317 5333.

Education and research
The college offers 18 undergraduate specialties covering Clinical Medicine, Nursing, Pharmacology, Dental Medicine, and Radiology Medicine.

In the postgraduate programs, there are 15 master's degree authorized units, covering nearly all the branches of basic and clinical medicine. There are also 15 research centers and facilities in the college.

Old and new campus
In September 2005 the new campus was opened. The old and new campus cover an area of 1098 mu, with a total construction area of 33 million square meters. The new campus is in the eastern outskirts of Bengbu City.

Ryuko beautiful Lake Avenue, the East China Sea No. 2600 is a research center for Graphic Information Center, theoretical teaching building, experimental teaching building, student apartments, graduate student apartments, life service center, the party government office buildings and other projects such as integrated sports hall.

Exchanges
There are international academic exchange activities, with the United States, France, and other countries. The college has invited the United States, Japan, Germany, Australia, Thailand, Canada, and other foreign experts and scholars to give lectures. Some teachers go abroad to study.

References

External links
Official website 
Agent Website of Bengbu Medical College

1958 establishments in China
Educational institutions established in 1958
Medical schools in China
Universities and colleges in Anhui
Bengbu